Brondesbury College for Boys is  a selective independent school for boys situated in Brent, London, England. It was founded by Yusuf Islam (formerly the pop star Cat Stevens) in 1996, as part of the Waqf Al-Birr Educational Trust, to provide an education institution for young Muslim students in the United Kingdom. Brondesbury College performs well in Brent and also nationally with an 83% 5+ A* - C pass rate in GCSE as of 2014. BCB's current head master is Mr Amzad Ali, who succeeded Mr Salahuddin Clifton.

A 2012 Ofsted inspection awarded Brondesbury College as 'Good' in all inspected aspects. The inspection stated that "The English curriculum is a particular strength of the school  but the focus of Quranic lessons is not always clear." Brondesbury college caters for years 7 to 11, primary school education is provided for at the government funded Islamia Primary School.

Recently, the 2018 Ofsted inspection awarded Brondesbury College as 'Outstanding' in all aspects. One of the main points were that ''Leaders and trustees are highly ambitious for pupils and are determined that the school continues to improve. They ensure that all of the independent school standards are met''.

See also

 Islamia Primary School

References

External links
 

Private boys' schools in London
Private schools in the London Borough of Brent
Islamic schools in London
Educational institutions established in 1996
1996 establishments in England